Scott Dennis Draper (born 5 June 1974) is an Australian former tennis player and golfer. He won the Australian Open Mixed Doubles with Samantha Stosur in 2005. Draper also reached the fourth round of the 1995 and 1996 French Opens, and the fourth round of the US Open in 1997. His most significant achievement in singles was winning the 1998 Queen's Club Championships, the lowest ranked player ever to do so.

Personal life
Draper was born in Queensland, Australia. He married his first wife, Kellie, in 1998 and she died in 1999 from cystic fibrosis.

Tennis career

Juniors
Draper reached a high of No. 5 in the junior world doubles rankings in 1992, after winning the Wimbledon Boys' Doubles title.

Junior Slam results – Singles:

Australian Open: SF (1992)
French Open: 1R (1992)
Wimbledon: 2R (1992)
US Open: –

Junior Grand Slam finals

Doubles: 1 (1 title)

ATP career finals

Singles: 3 (1 title, 2 runners-up)

Doubles: 1 (1 runner-up)

Mixed Doubles: 1 (1 title)

ATP Challenger and ITF Futures finals

Singles: 5 (5–0)

Doubles: 2 (1–1)

Performance timelines

Singles

Doubles

Mixed Doubles

Golf career
Draper has also played golf professionally. He made his professional debut in the 2005 Victorian Open, a 54-hole event played from 28 to 30 January. Draper had accepted an offer from Sam Stosur to play in the mixed doubles at the 2005 Australian Open which also finished on 30 January. Draper and Stosur reached the semi-final, which meant that Draper had to play in the first round of the golf in the morning and the semi-final of the tennis in the afternoon. Draper played his second round on the following day but missed the cut. This meant he was free to compete in the final of the mixed doubles on 30 January. On 11 February 2007, Draper won the New South Wales PGA Championship on the Von Nida Tour. He finished the four-round event with a score of 268, 20-under-par, one stroke ahead of Andrew Bonhomme and Aaron Townsend. Draper played as a professional golfer from 2005 to 2008 when a back injury ended his professional career. Although he played tennis left-handed, he played golf right-handed.

Professional wins (1)

Von Nida Tour wins (1)

References

External links
 
 
 
 
 
 

Australian male golfers
Australian male tennis players
Australian Open (tennis) champions
Grand Slam (tennis) champions in mixed doubles
Grand Slam (tennis) champions in boys' doubles
People educated at Brisbane State High School
Tennis people from the Gold Coast
Sportspeople from the Gold Coast, Queensland
PGA Tour of Australasia golfers
Tennis players from Brisbane
Wimbledon junior champions
1974 births
Living people
20th-century Australian people
21st-century Australian people